Acmella pusilla, the dwarf spotflower, is a species of flowering herb in the family Asteraceae. The plant is native to South America (Brazil, Argentina, Paraguay, Uruguay, etc.) and is naturalized in the southeastern United States (Florida, Georgia, North and South Carolina).

References 

pusilla
Flora of South America
Plants described in 1841